The Voyageurs Cup is the domestic trophy for professional soccer in Canada, awarded to the best men's and women's clubs in the country. 

The Cup was conceived and commissioned by fans of the Canada men's national team, the Voyageurs, in 2002. From 2002 to 2007, the cup was awarded annually to the Canadian team finishing with the best record in the USL First Division, from regular-season matches against other Canadian teams in the league. Since 2008, the trophy has been presented to the winner of the Canadian Championship, which also awards Canada's berth in the CONCACAF Champions League. Montreal Impact won the first seven trophies while Toronto FC took the next four. The current men's cup holder is Vancouver Whitecaps FC, after winning the 2022 Canadian Championship.

History
The Voyageurs Cup was first conceived in March 2002 by fans of the Canada men's national team, known as the Voyageurs, following Canada's surprise success at the 2000 Gold Cup. After years of being promised a domestic Canadian cup by the Canadian Soccer Association (CSA), the Voyageurs took it upon themselves to commission a national trophy using member donations. Veteran Voyageurs member and chief fundraiser since the group's founding in 1996, Dwayne Cole, solicited donations on the Voyageurs internet forum, resulting in $3,500-$4,000 donated. The money was used to commission the trophy, 

The group agreed to award the cup to whichever of the four Canadian clubs in the USL A-League – the Montreal Impact, Vancouver Whitecaps, Toronto Lynx and Calgary Storm – collected the most points against each other during the regular USL season.

Prior to the establishment of the Canadian Premier League, the cup had been contested by the Montreal Impact, Toronto Lynx, the USL and MLS incarnations of the Vancouver Whitecaps, Calgary Storm (later renamed Calgary Mustangs), Edmonton Aviators, Toronto FC, FC Edmonton and Ottawa Fury FC, along with the League1 Ontario and Première Ligue de soccer du Québec champions.

When the CPL launched, its teams were added into the draw, to expand the clubs to include Pacific FC, Cavalry FC, Valour FC, York9 FC, Forge FC and HFX Wanderers. 

The Montreal Impact won the first seven titles, the first six by virtue of their regular-season record in the USL against other Canadian sides. They won the inaugural 2008 Canadian Championship to retain the trophy, their seventh straight Voyageurs Cup victory. Toronto FC won the 2009 Canadian Championship to win the Voyageurs Cup for the first time. The Calgary Storm never finished higher than fourth in the competition while the Edmonton Aviators finished third in their lone appearance in the tournament. Both Alberta teams folded after the 2004 season. The Toronto Lynx finished as runners-up in four of the five years they participated, eventually dropping down to the Premier Development League in 2007 and effectively withdrawing from the competition. As a result, in 2007 the trophy was decided on regular-season USL results between the Montreal Impact and the Vancouver Whitecaps FC.

The cup is awarded by the Voyageurs, who were founded in 1996 as a national organization of fans of Canada men's national soccer team at all age levels. Until 2008, costs associated with the cup, such as engraving, shipping, maintenance, and promotion had been paid for by private donations from individual members of the Voyageurs. In 2008, the trophy was handed over to the Canadian Soccer Association to be presented to the winners of the Canadian Championship. The terms of the agreement were to be reviewed in 2010.

There is also a Voyageurs Cup West for Women and Voyageurs Cup East for Women awarded since 2004. The first Women's Voyageurs Super Cup was contested in 2006.

Titles by club

 * denotes team is no longer in operation.
 Bolded teams currently contest the Voyageurs Cup in the annual 2022 Canadian Championship.
 Statistics for CF Montréal include the original Montreal Impact of the USL and NASL, who contested the trophy from 2002 to 2011, before being replaced by a new MLS franchise of the same name and ownership.
 Statistics for Vancouver Whitecaps FC include the original Vancouver Whitecaps of the USL, who contested the trophy from 2002 to 2010, before being replaced by a new MLS franchise of the same name and ownership.

Past winners

Men's title

2002–2007: USL era
Prior to 2008, the men's title was decided on regular-season matches between Canada's USL A-League/USL First Division sides.

2008–2010: Canadian Championship, round robin format
The inaugural Canadian Championship was held in 2008, with the three Canadian teams spread across MLS (Toronto FC) and the USL First Division (Montreal Impact and Vancouver Whitecaps) each playing four non-League games in a round robin format.

2011–2020: Canadian Championship, knockout format
Beginning with the 2011 tournament, the format was different from previous editions. In 2011, with four teams involved, the tournament was changed to be a home-and-away semi-final round and a similar final round between the winners. Toronto, as reigning champions, were assigned the top seed and were matched with Edmonton, which was assigned the fourth seed as newcomers to the tournament. The two remaining teams, Montreal and Vancouver, faced off in the other semi-final.

Due to pandemic-related travel restriction and scheduling conflicts, the Canadian Soccer Association (CSA) announced that the 2020 tournament would consist solely of a single match final to be held between the winner of the head-to-head series between the three Canadian teams from Major League Soccer and the champion of the Canadian Premier League. On March 11, 2021, the Cup final between Toronto FC and Forge FC was postponed, initially indefinitely, but was finally scheduled for June 4, 2022.

2021: Canadian Championship, knockout format
The competition follows a similar format to the originally proposed 2020 edition with four rounds and regional pairings in the first two rounds. For the first time in the Canadian Championship, each tie will be played as a single-leg fixture.

Top goalscorers

Bolded players are still active players with a Canadian team.

Women's Voyageurs Cup

See also 
 James River Cup
 Southern Derby
 Canadian Classique
 Cascadia Cup

Notes

References

External links
 

 
Soccer cup competitions in Canada
CF Montréal
Toronto FC
Vancouver Whitecaps FC
Recurring sporting events established in 2002
2002 establishments in Canada
Soccer rivalries in Canada